A Million Ways to Die in the West is a 2014 novelization by Seth MacFarlane based on the film of the same name, written by MacFarlane, Alec Sulkin, and Wellesley Wild.

Development
On January 27, 2014, MacFarlane announced that he wrote a companion novel based on the film's script, which was released on March 4, 2014. An audiobook version was also made available, narrated by Jonathan Frakes.

References

2014 American novels
Novels based on films
Ballantine Books books
Western (genre) novels
Works by Seth MacFarlane
American comedy novels
2014 debut novels